In mathematics, the dual group refer to:

 Pontryagin dual, of a locally compact abelian group
 Langlands dual, of a reductive algebraic group
 The dual group in the Deligne–Lusztig theory